Manfred Morari (born 1951) is a world-leading control theorist who has made pioneering contributions to the theory and applications of Model Predictive Control, Internal Model Control (IMC) and Hybrid Systems. His book on Robust Process Control is considered to be definitive text on the subject. He is currently Peter and Susanne Armstrong Faculty Fellow at the University of Pennsylvania.  He received his Ph.D. in Chemical Engineering from the University of Minnesota in 1977.  Dr. Morari held positions at the University of Wisconsin, Madison from 1977–1983, the California Institute of Technology from 1983-1991, and the Swiss Federal Institute of Technology in Zurich ETH Zurich. He is considered as pioneer in field of Model Predictive Control, Control of Hybrid Systems, Internal Model Control (IMC), and robust control.

In recognition of his research contributions he received numerous awards, among them the Donald P. Eckman Award and the John R. Ragazzini Award of the Automatic Control Council, the Allan P. Colburn Award and the Professional Progress Award of the AIChE, the Curtis W. McGraw Research Award of the ASEE, Doctor Honoris Causa from Babes-Bolyai University, Fellow of IEEE and IFAC, and the IEEE Control Systems Field Award. He was also elected a member of the US National Academy of Engineering in 1993 for analysis of the effects of design on process operability and the development of techniques for robust process control. Manfred Morari has held appointments with Exxon and ICI plc and serves on the technical advisory boards of several major corporations. He received in 2005 the IEEE Control Systems Award, and in 2011 the Richard E. Bellman Control Heritage Award.

References

External links
Morari Faculty Page (University of Pennsylvania)
Morari Faculty Page (ETH Zurich)
Eckman Award

1951 births
Living people
University of Minnesota College of Science and Engineering alumni
Control theorists
Members of the United States National Academy of Engineering
Richard E. Bellman Control Heritage Award recipients